Underscore Records Pvt. Ltd. is a music label and website that specializes in music from India. It contains an online music store where you can source and buy various genres of Indian music presented by different artistes. All copyrights for the music on the site rest in most cases with the musicians who made and recorded it, and hence revenues generated from sales also go almost entirely to the artistes (up to 80%).

Concept and Scope
The company provides music from a variety of genres such as art/classical, folk and cross-cultural collaborative music, among others. The catalogue consists of audio and video recordings of both vocal and instrumental music, as well as lecture demonstrations and other educational material on music. Some of these recordings are archival or are made on location.

Underscore Records has a Resources section of the website where one can find links to other relevant information about music making in India.

Underscore Records Productions
These albums have been produced under the Underscore Records Pvt. Ltd. record label.
 Sanchay: Bandish Sangraha by Ashok Da. Ranade (2007)
 The Acoustic Keyboard in Raag Sangeet by Sudhir Nayak (2007)
 Tabla Solo: A Continuing Tradition by Aneesh Pradhan (2006)
 Living Music from the Past: Madhavrao Walawalkar (2006)
 Kausalya Manjeshwar
 Paavas Prasang by Shubha Mudgal
 Unorthodoxies: Reimagining Meera by Kiran Nagarkar, Shubha Mudgal and Aneesh Pradhan
 Living Music from the Past by Kesarbai Kerkar (2004)
 Kissa Punjab
 Sitar Tasir by Fateh Ali
 Rang Hori by Shubha Mudgal
 Koshish by Shubha Mudgal, Merlin DSouza, Sudhir Nayak, Murad Ali, Benoni Soans, and Aneesh Pradhan
 Romancing the Rain by Purbayan Chatterjee
 Voice of the Sarangi by Murad Ali
 Tabla: The Solo Tradition by Aneesh Pradhan
 Ramrang: Celebrating the Music of Ram Ashreya Jha
 Ram Ashreya Jha ‘Ramrang’
 Khayal & Thumri by Shubha Mudgal (DVD)
 Baajaa Gaajaa: Musical Instruments of India - 1 by Aneesh Pradhan (Book, 2008)

The Company Team
Co-director, Shubha Mudgal is a versatile Indian performer who has received training from some of India 's greatest musicians such as Ram Ashreya Jha, Vinay Chandra Maudgalya, Vasant Thakar, Jitendra Abhisheki, Kumar Gandharva and Naina Devi. Awarded the Padmashri by the Government of India in 2000, she is acclaimed both as a composer and a performer, and maintains a keen and active interest in multimedia and Internet projects related to music.

Co-director, Aneesh Pradhan is disciple of tabla maestro Nikhil Ghosh, Aneesh has gained recognition both as a soloist and an accompanist to vocal and instrumental music as well as dance. In addition to being an accomplished performer, Aneesh was awarded a doctoral degree in history from the University of Mumbai . A successful composer, Aneesh has also written on music and has been involved as a contributor to and editor for websites on Indian music.

References

External links
 
 https://web.archive.org/web/20110717154247/http://podcasts.underscorerecords.com/
 http://baajaagaajaa.com

Indian music record labels
Indian record labels
Record labels established in 2003